A banner is a symbol-bearing flag.

Banner may also refer to:

Places

United States
 Banner, California, San Diego County, an unincorporated community
 Banner, Illinois, a village
 Banner, Kentucky, an unincorporated community
 Banner, Missouri, an unincorporated community
 Banner, Mississippi, an unincorporated community
 Banner, Ohio, an unincorporated community
 Banner, Virginia, an unincorporated community
 Banner, Wisconsin, an unincorporated community
 Banner, Wyoming, an unincorporated community
 Banner County, Nebraska
 Banner Township (disambiguation)
 Banner Mountain, California
 Banner Peak, California

Elsewhere
 Banner (administrative division), found in Asia
 Banner (Inner Mongolia), administrative division
 Banner, a community in the township of Zorra, Ontario, Canada

Surname
 Banner (surname), a list of people and fictional characters

In publishing
 Banner (newspaper), a list of newspapers
 Banner (publishing), a newspaper's logo
 The Banner (magazine), published by the Christian Reformed Church of North America

In arts & entertainment
 Banner Theatre, an English-based community theatre company
 Banner Records, a record label
 The Banner (band), an American metalcore band
 Banners (musician), English musician
 Banner (album), by Desperation Band, 2014

Other
 , two ships named after Banner County, Nebraska
 Banner (Australian rules football), supporters' banner
 Banner (playing card), used in Swiss-suited cards
 Banner page, a page inserted between documents by computerized printing in order to separate them
 Web banner, a form of online advertising
 Banner (Unix), a program for generating a large ASCII art version of input text
 Banner School District, El Reno, Oklahoma
 Banner (strawberry), a defunct strawberry variety
 Banner Health, a non-profit health system based in Phoenix, Arizona
 Banner Bank, a commercial bank headquartered in Walla Walla, Washington
 Banner (Mongols), a pole with circularly arranged horse or yak tail hairs of varying colors arranged at the top
 Banner (cavalry), the basic administrative unit of the Polish and Lithuanian cavalry from the 14th century
 Banner or Eublemma anachoresis, a moth of the family Erebidae

See also
 Ban (disambiguation)
 Banna (disambiguation)